Official = Kankara LGA 
Other name = Kankara
Native name = Kankara Ta Danjanmakka mai gwanjon karfe

Settlement_type = LGA Headquarters and town
Motto = Kankara Ta Danjanmakka mai gwanjon karfe

Government_type = Local Government Area
Year of Creation = 1989
Leader_title = Sarkin Pauwan Katsina, District Head of Kankara
Leader_title = Kanwan Katsina, District Head of Ketare
Magnitude Area =1,462 KM²
Postal Area Code = 832
Total Population (2006 Census) = 245,739
Total Population (2021 Projection) = 382853
Number of Settlements = 862
Major Occupation = Farming and Businesses
By Muhammad Kasim Sada

Wards
The LGA has 11 political wards 
 Burdugau
 Danmurabu
 Gundawa
 Pauwa
 Kankara
 Ketare
 Kukasheka 
 Mabai 
 Yargoje
 Yar'Tsamiya
 Zango
The LGA has 19 Village Heads,with 350 Community Leaders.
The LGA has 1 General Hospital, 1 Comprehensive Health Centre, 15 Primary Health Care, 2 Private clinics, and 42 Health Clinics and Dispensaries.  Based on GIS map the LGA has total population of 405,438, target population of the children under one year is 16217, pregnant women 20271, women of child-bearing age is 89196, children under five years old 81,087.
By Muhammad Kasim
07010191427

Kankara kidnapping

A mass kidnapping was committed by Arm Bandits at a Government Science School Kankara on 11 December 2020.

References

Nadabo I, (1988) Kankara Historical Stages... 

Local Government Areas in Katsina State